Sandra Brentnall (born 27 June 1962) is an Australian former soccer player who played for the Australia women's national soccer team between 1978 and 1983.

References

1962 births
Australian women's soccer players
Australia women's international soccer players
Living people
Women's association footballers not categorized by position